Cythara caimitica is an extinct species of sea snail, a marine gastropod mollusk in the family Mangeliidae.

This species is considered a nomen dubium.

Description
The length of the shell varies between 2 mm and 11 mm.

Distribution
This extinct marine species was found in Miocene strata in the Dominican Republic; age range: 11.608 to 5.332 Ma

References

 C. J. Maury. 1917. Santo Domingo type sections and fossils. Bulletins of American Paleontology 5(30): 1–43

External links
 Fossilworks: Cythara caimitica 

caimitica